Vexillum (Costellaria) funereum is a species of small sea snail, marine gastropod mollusk in the family Costellariidae, the ribbed miters.

Description
The shell size varies between 20 mm and  30mm

Distribution
This species is distributed in the Indian Ocean along Réunion and in the Pacific Ocean along the Philippines and the Solomons Islands.

References

 Turner H. 2001. Katalog der Familie Costellariidae Macdonald, 1860. Conchbooks. 1-100 page(s): 33

External links
 Reeve, L. A. (1844-1845). Monograph of the genus Mitra. In: Conchologia Iconica, or, illustrations of the shells of molluscous animals, vol. 2, pl. 1-39 and unpaginated text. L. Reeve & Co., London.

funereum
Gastropods described in 1844